The Bryan Whitfield Herring Farm is a historic plantation house located near Calypso, Duplin County, North Carolina. It was built about 1850, and is a -story, five bay by four bay, gable-end, frame house in the Greek Revival style. It features a double-story entrance porch and four massive gable~end chimneys.

It was listed on the National Register of Historic Places in 2001.

See also
Needham Whitfield Herring House

References

External links
The B.W.Herring House

Plantation houses in North Carolina
Houses on the National Register of Historic Places in North Carolina
Greek Revival houses in North Carolina
Houses completed in 1850
Houses in Duplin County, North Carolina
National Register of Historic Places in Duplin County, North Carolina
Whitfield family residences